Aulikki Ristoja (also Ristoja-Lehtimäki, born 2 January 1949) is a Finnish chess player who holds the title of Lady International Correspondence Chess Master (LIMC, 1998). She is a three-time winner the Finnish Women Chess Championship (1979, 1988, 2000).

Chess career
In Finnish Chess Championships for women she has won 3 gold (1979, 1988, 2000), 5 silver (1976, 1981 (shared), 1983, 1987, 1997 (shared)) and 4 bronze (1978, 1980, 1985, 1999) medals.

Aulikki Ristoja played for Finland in the Women's Chess Olympiads:
 In 1976, at third board in the 7th Chess Olympiad (women) in Haifa (+5, =2, -3).
 In 1978, at first reserve board in the 8th Chess Olympiad (women) in Buenos Aires (+5, =0, -5).
 In 1982, at first reserve board in the 10th Chess Olympiad (women) in Lucerne (+7, =1, -3).
 In 1988, at first board in the 28th Chess Olympiad (women) in Thessaloniki (+2, =1, -8).
 In 2000, at first reserve board in the 34th Chess Olympiad (women) in Istanbul (+2, =1, -5).

Aulikki Ristoja is the first Finnish correspondence chess player who holds the title of Lady International Correspondence Chess Master (LIM, 1998). She was also the first Finnish chess player who participated in ICCF Ladies World Championship and placed 11th in the VI final tournament.

Books
 Ristoja, Aulikki; Ristoja, Thomas (1995). Perusteet. Shakki (in Finnish). .

References

External links
 
 
 
 
 

1949 births
Living people
Finnish chess players
Chess Olympiad competitors
Finnish female chess players